Dendy Cinema Pty Limited is an Australian cinema chain. Dendy operates in Canberra, Brisbane, Sydney and the Gold Coast. Its main competitors are Hoyts, Village, Event, Wallis Cinemas, Palace Cinemas and Reading. It is a subsidiary of Icon Productions.

Ownership history
Dendy Cinemas launched screens in Brisbane in 1990 when Lyn McCarthy and Graham Tubbenhauer took over the former Metro Arts cinema in Edward Street. 

The Becker Group purchased the Dendy Cinemas chain in December 1997 and took over management in 1998. Prime Media Group took control of Becker Group, including Dendy Cinemas, in 2007. Prime made a bid to buy the Hoyts cinema chain in September 2007 and after it missed out, media reported that Prime was looking to sell Dendy Cinemas before the end of the year.

After a long takeover bid, Mel Gibson's company Icon Film Distribution paid Prime $21 million for the cinema chain in 2008. Becker Group had originally planned to sell its cinema assets to the Becker family.

Cinema operations

Brisbane: Since 1990
Lyn McCarthy and Graham Tubbenhauer launched a Dendy Cinema in 1990 on Edward Street. In 1994, the Dendy Cinemas chain took over The George on George Street, Brisbane and added a second screen to the complex. The two-screen Dendy complex closed in 2008.

Dendy opened a cinema at Portside Wharf in Hamilton in 2006.

In 2015, Dendy Cinemas committed to a 15-year lease to operate a 10-theatre cinema complex in Coorparoo Square in Brisbane's inner southeast.

Sydney
Dendy Martin Place, a single-screen cinema, opened in 1981 screening Stepping Out, a documentary by Chris Noonan. Barbara Grummells and Fred O'Brien were the owners, launching the venue with the slogan "From tart house to art house".

Dendy closed its Circular Quay cinema on 26 February 2020 after a decision not to renew its lease.

, the sole remaining Dendy cinema is in Newtown.

Byron Bay: 2002 to 2012
Dendy operated a Byron Bay cinema complex between 2002 and 2012. Movie chain Palace announced it would take over the site.

Canberra: Since 2006
In 2005, Canberra cinema Electric Shadows, which was established in 1979, announced it would partner with Dendy Cinemas to establish a cinema complex in the Canberra Centre. The Canberra complex featured nine cinemas in a 4000 sq m complex, with seats for up to 1600 people. The complex opened ahead of Christmas 2006. In 2015, the Dendy Cinemas chain proposed an expansion to the cinemas complex in Canberra that would result in around 100 fewer carparks and six new cinemas.

Dendy Direct
In 2014, Dendy Cinemas launched an online movie store, Dendy Direct, featuring movies to rent or buy. Dendy Direct was shut down on 14 May, 2018 amid pressure from other competing streaming services such as Netflix and Stan.

See also
Sydney Film Festival - Dendy sponsors awards there

References

Australian brands
Cinema chains in Australia
1980 establishments in Australia